Karl Mojaleski (born April 28, 1965), known by his stage name Karl Logan, is an American convicted sex offender and former musician, best known for being the former guitarist of the heavy metal band Manowar from 1994 to 2018.

Biography
Logan graduated Lakeland High School near Clifford, Pennsylvania in 1982. He joined Manowar in 1994 after local band gigs in northeastern Pennsylvania with Arc Angel (which also featured a post-Twisted Sister A. J. Pero on drums for a while) and Fallen Angel featuring Ed Collins.

Logan relates in Hell on Earth Part I how he met Joey DeMaio by almost running him over with his motorcycle, which is how the two hit it off.

Logan is a fan of dirt biking. In 2006, he suffered an arm injury which delayed Manowar's "Demons, Dragons and Warriors" tour and the release of the band's new album Gods of War. According to sources the injury was so severe that "it could have resulted in permanent nerve damage, ending his musical career", however Logan recovered and subsequently played with the band.

More recently Logan has released a line of custom designed guitars which are sold through Manowar's website. In 2009, Logan accepted a limited number of students for one-to-one guitar lessons over Skype.

Legal issues
On August 9, 2018, Logan was arrested in Charlotte, North Carolina for allegedly possessing child pornography and was charged with six counts of third-degree exploitation of a minor. His bail was set at $35,000, which he had since bonded out. Manowar issued a statement shortly after saying that he would not perform with them on their last world tour. Evidence revealed that Logan was in possession of several videos depicting young girls between ages 4 and 12 years old being engaged in a variety of sexual acts with unidentified men. According to arrest warrants, the offenses took place between June 18 and August 2, 2018.

His attorney Brad Smith said that he was "extremely cooperative with the investigation from the beginning, and he'll continue to do that." He wouldn't comment on the details of the charges; however, he did say that there could be an explanation on the acts that Logan was accused of committing. Logan made his first court appearance on May 28, 2019 and was then booked into the Mecklenburg County Sheriff's Office thereafter, in which the federal magistrate judge ordered him to be held until his next hearing, which would possibly take place the next day. He did not enter a plea, and would not do so for months. He was released from jail on May 30 after spending two days in custody, in which his hearing took place that day.

Logan faced at least 25 years in prison for admitting in a federal courtroom that he had downloaded and kept the explicit material in his possession. He was sentenced to 5 1/2 years in prison on July 15, 2022 for possessing the material as a result.

See also
Manowar discography

References

External links
 Official Manowar Website
 Karl's profile on the FineScale modeler forum: 
 A link to a brief listing of some of the models he has created: 

Living people
Manowar members
American heavy metal guitarists
1965 births
20th-century American guitarists
American people convicted of child pornography offenses
Musicians from Pennsylvania
People from Carbondale, Pennsylvania
Criminals from Pennsylvania